"Nobody" is a song by Japanese-American singer Mitski, released in 2018 as the second single from her fifth studio album, Be the Cowboy. The Harvard Crimson, considering the song to be about loneliness, wrote that it is eerily upbeat, with melancholic lyrics contradicting its catchy melody.

Music video
A music video for the song was released on the same day as the single, directed by Christopher Good. About the music video, Mitski said "We shot this video over five days, in both sides of Kansas City. I've never been able to take this much time to shoot a video, so it was wonderful to have the space to get the details right, as well as actually hang out and have fun with everyone involved. This video made me fall unexpectedly in love with Kansas City." She also said "It was actually hard to get this one little shot where the magnifying glass goes directly in front of my eye, because in one swift motion I had to raise the magnifying glass at exactly the right angle where the camera catches my blurry eye right behind it. We did a lot of the shots in this video over and over, it had to be precise. And I loved every minute of it."

Paper wrote that the video "doubles as apt social commentary about loneliness and women utilizing emotion, even of the intense variety, as a locus of power and control."

Reception
Pitchfork wrote, "despite the melancholy piano chords and simmering four-on-the-floor beat, Mitski embodies her album title: She sounds like a wallflower joining the aching, lonesome tradition of sad cowboys like Hank Williams. Her lyrics are raw and essential, the same mix of vulnerability and strength that made songs like 2014's 'I Don't Smoke' feel like emotional armor, and instantly classic."

Stereogum considered "Nobody" to be the best Mitski song, writing that "there's plenty to love about 'Nobody': The tight hi-hat drumming, the plainspoken tale, the gracefulness with which Mitski leaps to high notes. The best part, however, comes at the very end: A key change reprise", as well as saying that "it's the most musically joyful song about a panic attack out there, and, in classic Mitski fashion, she knows the most terrifying way to end it is by suggesting there' no end at all."

Consequence also thought that the song was Mitski's best, writing that it has "not only become finer with age, it's an example of what she does best: there's a universe of emotions, a deep longing for intimacy and connection, for somebody, crammed into a three-minute disco track, immediately relatable, dance-worthy, and devastating at the same time."

Spin wrote, "You would think a song made up of someone looping the word “nobody” over and over is doomed to fail but Mitski manages to turn kitschy into catchy without being overwrought."

AllMusic critic Marcy Donelson thought that the song was a highlight on the album, describing "Nobody" as "disco-injected".

References

2018 singles
2018 songs
Dead Oceans singles
Mitski songs
Songs written by Mitski